Jorma Sandelin (born 4 June 1936) is a Finnish archer. He competed in the men's individual event at the 1972 Summer Olympics.

References

External links
 

1936 births
Living people
Finnish male archers
Olympic archers of Finland
Archers at the 1972 Summer Olympics
People from Kristinestad
Sportspeople from Ostrobothnia (region)